Elandspark is a suburb of Johannesburg, South Africa. It is located in Region 9.

Demographics 
According to the South African National Census of 2011, 3,334 people lived in Elandspark.

52.1% were White, 29.5% Black African, 12.4% Coloured and 5.9% Indian or Asian.

47.6% spoke English, 23.7% Afrikaans, 10.9% Zulu, 4.7% Sotho, 3.1% Tswana, 3.0% Xhosa, 2.9% Northern Sotho, 1.1% Tsonga, 0.6% Venda, 0.3% Swazi, 0.3% Southern Ndebele and 1.7% some other language as their first language.

References

Johannesburg Region F